Greystanes High School is a publicly funded comprehensive co-educational secondary school located in Greystanes, New South Wales, Australia.

Layout 
The school comprises eight blocks, including a canteen, a library and a hall. It also has a large quadrangle sheltered-area. Each block, except the canteen, the library, the hall, and C-Block, are double-story buildings.

A-Block - PDHPE, Japanese, Science and two Technological and Applied Studies courses (cooking, and home economics) are taught in this block. The lower level houses two fully equipped and recently refurbished science rooms, three fully equipped cooking rooms, an in-school gym and the science staffroom. The upper level houses one computer room, several classroom and the home economics room and the PDHPE staff room.

B-Block - School canteen, toilets, and change rooms for both sexes.

C-Block - This block is dedicated to the Industrial Arts faculty with four specially designed woodwork & metalwork rooms, a computer room and the TAS staff room. This block teaches woodwork, metalwork, engineering studies, electronic studies and plastics.

D-Block - Music, Geography, History, Legal Studies, Economics, Business Studies and Art are taught in this block. The lower level houses the front office, the principal's office, the sick bay, two art rooms, one computer room and one regular classroom. The upper level houses the HSIE staff room, two music rooms, and several classrooms.

E-Block - Maths, Science and English are taught in this block. The bottom level houses two fully equipped and recently refurbished science rooms and several classrooms (primarily used by the maths faculty). The upper level houses the English staff room and several classroom (primarily used by the English faculty).

F-Block - School Hall

G-Block - Maths, Science, Computing Studies, Drama, Art and the Special Education classes are taught in this block. The bottom level houses the maths staff room, several classroom (primarily used by the maths faculty), four fully equipped and recently refurbished science rooms, a drama room, a darkroom, and toilets. The upper level houses two art rooms, the attendance office, the timetable office, several classrooms (primarily used by the maths faculty and the special needs faculty), the guidance counselor's office, and one computer room.

H-Block - School Library. Includes two computer labs. It also features the server room, and the careers advisor's office.

Houses and colours 
The school's student population is organised into four houses for the purposes of sporting competitions, mentoring, roll marking and the like:
  Bradman - Blue - named for the cricketer, Sir Don Bradman
  Gilmore - Yellow - named for the writer and activist, Dame Mary Gilmore
  Monash - Green - named for the engineer and citizen soldier, General Sir John Monash
  Parkes - Red - named for the Australian statesman, Sir Henry Parkes

References 

Educational institutions established in 1961
Public high schools in Sydney
1961 establishments in Australia